This is a list of Bangladeshi films released in 1993.

Releases

See also

1993 in Bangladesh
List of Bangladeshi films of 1994
List of Bangladeshi films
Cinema of Bangladesh
Dhallywood

References

Film
Bangladesh
 1993